{{Infobox government cabinet
| cabinet_type            = Ministry
| cabinet_number          = 
| jurisdiction            = Madhya Pradesh
| flag                    = 
| flag_border             = true
| incumbent               = 
| image                   = Shivraj Singh Chauhan (cropped 2).jpg
| image_size              = 150px
| caption                 = Shivraj Singh ChouhanHon'ble Chief Minister of Madhya Pradesh 
| date_formed             = 23 March 2020 
| date_dissolved          = 
| government_head         = Shivraj Singh Chouhan
| government_head_history = 
| state_head              = GovernorMangubhai C. Patel
| members_number          = 31
| former_members_number   = 5
| total_number            = 
| political_parties       = BJP| legislature_status      = 

 NDA

 UPA

| opposition_cabinet      = 
| opposition_party        = INC 
| opposition_leader       = Govind Singh
| election                = 2018
| last_election           = 2018
| legislature_term        = 5 years
| budget                  = 
| advice_and_consent1     = 
| advice_and_consent2     = 

| incoming_formation      = 2020
| outgoing_formation      = 
| previous                = Kamal Nath ministry
| successor               =
}}

The Shivraj Singh Chauhan Fourth ministry''' is the Council of Ministers in 15th Madhya Pradesh Legislative Assembly headed by Chief Minister Shivraj Singh Chouhan.

Council of Ministers

Ministers of state

References

Lists of current Indian state and territorial ministries
2020 in Indian politics
2020 establishments in Madhya Pradesh
Cabinets established in 2020
Bharatiya Janata Party state ministries
Chouhan 04
Chief Ministership of Shivraj Singh Chouhan